Iphionopsis is a genus of African flowering plants in the daisy family.

 Species<
 Iphionopsis ilicifolia (Humbert) Anderb. - Madagascar
 Iphionopsis oblanceolata N.Kilian - Somalia
 Iphionopsis rotundifolia (Oliv. & Hiern) Anderb. - Somalia

References

Inuleae
Asteraceae genera
Flora of Africa